Autoinducer-2 (AI-2), a furanosyl borate diester or tetrahydroxy furan (species dependent), is a member of a family of signaling molecules used in quorum sensing. AI-2 is one of only a few known biomolecules incorporating boron. First identified in the marine bacterium Vibrio harveyi, AI-2 is produced and recognized by many Gram-negative and Gram-positive bacteria. AI-2 arises by the reaction of 4,5-Dihydroxy-2,3-pentanedione, which is produced enzymatically with boric acid, and is recognized by the two-component sensor kinase LuxPQ in Vibrionaceae.

AI-2 is actively transported by the Lsr ABC-type transporter into the cell in Enterobacteriaceae and few other bacterial taxa (Pasteurella, Photorhabdus, Haemophilus, Bacillus), where it is phosphorylated by LsrK. Then, Phospho-AI-2 binds the transcriptional repressor protein, LsrR, which subsequently is released from the promoter/operator region of the lsr operon – and transcription of the lsr genes is initiated. AI-2 signalling is also regulated by glucose and cAMP/CRP via the lsr operon. In the presence of glucose, low levels of cAMP/CRP result in almost no lsr operon (lsrABCDFG) expression. Without glucose, cAMP-CRP is needed to stimulate the lsr expression, while LsrR represses its expression in the absence of the inducer, phospho-AI-2. As AI-2 accumulates, more AI-2 is taken in via LsrABCD, phosphorylated via LsrK, and the lsr transcription is de-repressed, enabling even more AI-2 uptake.

Doubts have been expressed regarding AI-2's status as a universal signal. Although the luxS gene, which encodes the protein responsible for AI-2 production is widespread, the latter has mainly a primary metabolic role in the recycling of S-adenosyl-L-methionine, with AI-2 being a by-product of that process. An unequivocally AI-2 related behavior was found to be restricted primarily to organisms bearing known AI-2 receptor genes. Thus, while it is certainly true that some bacteria respond to AI-2, it is doubtful that it is always being produced for purposes of signaling.

References 

Signal transduction
Cell biology
Cell communication
Cell signaling
Tetrahydroxyborate esters